The Tamron SP 45mm 1.8 Di VC USD is an interchangeable standard prime lens for cameras with a full-frame or smaller sensor. On an APS-C camera, its field of view is narrower, so as to be more useful as a short portrait lens. It was announced by Tamron on September 2, 2015.

References

45
Camera lenses introduced in 2015